The Māori Language Act 1987 was a piece of legislation passed by the Parliament of New Zealand that gave official language status to the Māori language, and gave speakers a right to use it in legal settings such as courts. It also established the Māori Language Commission, initially called , to promote the language and provide advice on it. The law was enacted as the Maori Language Act 1987 and originally written without macrons.

The 1987 act was repealed by section 48 of the Māori Language Act 2016, however there were no major changes from the provisions of the old legislation and the 2016 act merely updated the 1987 law with new provisions and language.

Context
The act was the result of years of campaigning by Māori, particularly those involved in the Māori protest movement. It was also the result of shifts in thinking about the Treaty of Waitangi. By the mid-1980s, the treaty had acquired increased relevance thanks primarily to the Waitangi Tribunal. The act also drew on a number of international precedents, primarily the  Act 1978 of Ireland, which is cited several times in the legislation, but also the Welsh Language Act 1967 of the United Kingdom, which enabled the use of the Welsh language in Welsh court proceedings.

Despite the act, Māori does not have the same status under law as English. For example, tax records must be kept in English unless the Commissioner of Internal Revenue agrees otherwise.

1991 amendment
It also slightly expanded the range of legal settings in which Māori could be used, to include bodies such as the Tenancy Tribunal and any Commission of Inquiry.

Repeal by 2016 act
The 1987 act was repealed on 30 April 2016 by section 48 of Te Ture mō Te Reo Māori 2016 / Māori Language Act 2016, which updated the law. As a New Zealand first, there are two versions of the new act, one in Māori and the other in English, with section 12 stating that if there was any conflict in meaning between the two versions, the Māori version would prevail.

References

Bibliography

External links
 Maori Language Act 1987 as enacted
 Māori Language Act 1987 as at 30 April 2016
 Te Ture mō Te Reo Māori 2016 / Māori Language Act 2016

Treaty of Waitangi
Māori politics
Māori language
1987 in New Zealand law
Statutes of New Zealand
Language legislation
Language revival